Penthosiosoma is a genus of parasitic flies in the family Tachinidae. There are at least three described species in Penthosiosoma.

Species
These three species belong to the genus Penthosiosoma:
 Penthosiosoma picitipenne Townsend, 1926
 Penthosiosoma pictipenne Townsend
 Penthosiosoma pictipennis Townsend

References

Further reading

 
 
 
 

Tachinidae
Articles created by Qbugbot